Great Ellingham is a village and civil parish in the Breckland District of Norfolk. The village lies 2.5 miles north-west of Attleborough, 2 miles south-east of its sister village of Little Ellingham and 12 miles by road south from Dereham.

The site of Great Ellingham has been inhabited since pre-historic times and is documented in the Domesday book of 1086. Its name comes from the Old English for 'The homestead of Ella's or Eli's people'.  The medieval period provides the oldest surviving, mainly 14th century, building of St James the Great's Church,  in the Benefice of Great Ellingham. This "attractive chequered flintwork and battlemented west tower [is] topped by a lead spire" was restored in the early 20th century. The spire can be viewed from some distance away as the village is approached on the Attleborough road.

The village has a number of early thatched properties, though no longer serving their original function, such as the 15th century probable hall house divided into two cottages but now one dwelling and shop Ye Olde Thatche Shoppe.

The Crown public house, one of six pubs that used to be in the village, was once called The Bell and dates from the mid-18th century.

Schools 
Great Ellingham primary school teaches just over 150 pupils up to the age of 11.

Teddy Bear festival 
The village is renowned locally for its annual Teddy Bear Festival, which runs for two weeks in July. Alongside other events, villagers build and display straw bears in their gardens to create a "Teddy Bear Trail". Since the start of the festival in 2004, around £50,000 has been raised for local good causes and charities.

References

Villages in Norfolk
Civil parishes in Norfolk
Breckland District